William Wainwright (24 November 1908 – 27 October 2000) was a British communist activist.

Wainwright was born in 1908. He grew up in Stepney in the East End of London, and studied chemistry at Chelsea Polytechnic before joining the Communist Party of Great Britain (CPGB). He was an active anti-fascist in the 1930s, protecting communist meetings from attacks and heckling the leader of the British Union of Fascists, Oswald Mosley.

In the late 1930s, Wainwright was the national organiser for the Young Communist League and editor of Challenge, its newspaper.  He joined the Home Guard during World War II while producing publicity for the CPGB, then after the war led the British Soviet Friendship Society.  He contributed to the Morning Star as science editor, and served as Assistant General Secretary of the party from 1956 until 1959.

Wainwright retired from the CPGB's executive committee in 1975.  In 1985, he was dropped as science editor from the Morning Star amid factional struggles, but was reinstated after protests.  He remained a member of the CPGB until its dissolution, which he opposed, and joined its successor, Democratic Left.

Wainwright died on 27 October 2000, aged 91.

References

1908 births
2000 deaths
Alumni of King's College London
Communist Party of Great Britain members
People from Stepney